Alexandre Taché (August 17, 1899 – March 9, 1961) was a lawyer and political figure in Quebec. He represented Hull in the Legislative Assembly of Quebec from 1936 to 1939 and from 1944 to 1956 as a Union Nationale member. Taché was Speaker of the Legislative Assembly from 1945 to 1955.

He was born in Saint-Hyacinthe, Quebec, the son of Joseph de La Broquerie Taché and Marie-Louise Langevin. Taché was educated at the Séminaire de Saint-Hyacinthe, the University of Ottawa and the Université de Montréal. He was called to the Quebec bar in 1924 and set up practice in Hull. In 1925, he married Berthe Laflamme. He was named King's Counsel in 1938. He was bâtonnier for the Hull bar in 1939 and 1944. Taché was defeated when he ran for reelection to the Quebec assembly in 1939. He resigned his seat in the Quebec assembly in 1956 when he was named judge in the magistrate's court for Hull, Terrebonne and Pontiac districts. In 1958, he was named to the Quebec Superior Court.

Taché died in Hull at the age of 61 and was buried in the Notre-Dame de Hull Cemetery.

References

External links 
 The Alexandre Taché House, The Architecture of Old Hull, Canadian Museum of Civilization

1899 births
1961 deaths
Presidents of the National Assembly of Quebec
Union Nationale (Quebec) MNAs
Judges in Quebec
People from Saint-Hyacinthe
Politicians from Gatineau
Canadian King's Counsel